Mischa Boelens (born 23 February 1995) is a Curaçaoan football player who plays for VV Duno Doorwerth. He also holds Dutch citizenship.

Club career
He made his professional debut in the Eerste Divisie for Achilles '29 on 7 August 2015 in a game against Jong Ajax.

References

External links
 

1995 births
Dutch people of Curaçao descent
Living people
Curaçao footballers
Achilles '29 players
Eerste Divisie players
Association football defenders